Prebble Icefalls are a set of icefalls on the southwestern side of Midnight Plateau in the Darwin Mountains. They occupy two large cirques southwestward of Mount Ellis and fall about 900 meters. Discovered by the Victoria University of Wellington Antarctic Expedition (VUWAE) (1962–63) and named for W.M. Prebble, geologist with the expedition.

Icefalls of Oates Land